010 is the debut studio album by the rock band Ulysses. The album was recorded using one microphone and released in monaural audio (instead of the standard stereo sound that most modern albums take advantage of). This is because the songs on the album were originally intended to be demos, but the band were so satisfied with the performances that only a few overdubs were added for the album release.

Track listing

Personnel
 Robert Beatty – Synthesizer, Electronics
 John Ferguson – Drums, Vocals (background)
 Ben Fulton – Synthesizer, Bass
 Robert Schneider – Guitar, Vocals
 Steve Keene – Illustrations
 Ulysses – Engineer
 Charlie Watts – Mastering

References

2004 debut albums
Ulysses (band) albums
Eenie Meenie Records albums